Kyle O'Donnell (born 9 October 1990) is an Australian former professional rugby league footballer. He is the younger brother of Australian international Luke O'Donnell.

Playing career
Born in Nowra, New South Wales, O'Donnell played his junior football for the Greystanes Devils, he attended Primary school at Mount Pritchard East in Sydney's south-western suburbs. In 2008, O'Donnell played for the NSW CCC side. He was then signed by the Cronulla-Sutherland Sharks. O'Donnell played for the Sharks' NYC team in 2009 and 2010, scoring 7 tries in 30 games.

On 27 June 2010, O'Donnell signed a 2-year contract with the Newcastle Knights starting in 2011. Knights coach Rick Stone said O'Donnell was player with real potential. In 2010, O'Donnell was selected in the Junior Kangaroos squad to play the Junior Kiwis.

In the same week as playing for Residents team, O'Donnell made his NRL debut for the Knights against the South Sydney Rabbitohs in Round 18 of the 2012 season after initially being named 18th man. Just 7 minutes into his debut, O'Donnell was knocked out from clashing heads with Sam Burgess and had to be assisted off the field with concussion.

On 2 August 2012, O'Donnell signed a 2-year contract with the Penrith Panthers starting in 2013. In 2012, O'Donnell was selected on the bench for the NSW Residents team to play the QLD Residents at Suncorp Stadium as a curtain raiser to the Game 3, State of Origin decider.

On 18 November 2013, O'Donnell signed a 1-year contract with the Canberra Raiders starting in 2014 after not being able to break into the Panthers' NRL team. While at Canberra, O'Donnell played for the Mount Pritchard Mounties in the NSW Cup before retiring at the end of the 2015 season.

References

External links
Canberra Raiders profile

1990 births
Living people
Australian people of Irish descent
Australian rugby league players
Canberra Raiders players
Central Coast Centurions players
Junior Kangaroos players
Mount Pritchard Mounties players
Newcastle Knights players
Rugby league locks
Rugby league players from Nowra, New South Wales
Rugby league props
Rugby league second-rows